Daviesia pectinata, commonly known as thorny bitter-pea, is a species of flowering plant in the family Fabaceae and is endemic to south-eastern continental Australia. It is a dense, rigid shrub with erect, flattened branchlets, crowded, flattened, triangular phyllodes, and yellow to orange and reddish flowers.

Description

Taxonomy and naming
Daviesia pectinata was first formally described in 1838 by John Lindley in Thomas Mitchell's journal, Three Expeditions into the interior of Eastern Australia. The specific epithet (pectinata) means "in the form of a comb".

Distribution and habitat
Thorny bitter-pea grows in open forest, woodland or mallee from the Eyre and Fleurieu Peninsulas to Goolwa in South Australia and in the Little Desert and Horsham areas of western Victoria.

References

pectinata
Flora of South Australia
Flora of Victoria (Australia)
Plants described in 1838
Taxa named by John Lindley